Ursa is a genus of orb-weaver spiders first described by Eugène Simon in 1895.

Species
 it contains five species:
 Ursa flavovittata Simon, 1909 – Vietnam
 Ursa lunula (Nicolet, 1849) – Chile
 Ursa pulchra Simon, 1895 (type) – Brazil
 Ursa turbinata Simon, 1895 – South Africa
 Ursa vittigera Simon, 1895 – Sri Lanka

References

Araneidae
Araneomorphae genera
Taxa named by Eugène Simon